Barrettali is a commune in the Haute-Corse department of France on the island of Corsica.

Among the villages in the commune is the hamlet of Minerbio.

Population

Personalities
Ange Leccia (b. 1952 in Minerbio), photographer and video artist;
Jean-Pierre Santini, writer and editor autonomist clandestine (editions A Fior di Carta);
 Alexandre Bodak, a doctor, a composer and a virtuoso pianist.

See also
Communes of the Haute-Corse department

References

Communes of Haute-Corse